Albert Ramsawack (25 August 1932 – 25 September 2021) was a Trinidad and Tobago folklorist, author, broadcaster and educator who was the author of more than 300 children's stories and books including the Folklore Stories of Trinidad and Tobago. Born in Sangre Grande, Ramsawack lived most of his life in Rousillac in south Trinidad. Ramsawack was awarded the Hummingbird Medal (Silver) in 2004 and a Certificate of Recognition from the Environmental Management Authority in 2021 in recognition of his environmental stewardship.

Early life and education
Ramsawack was born Sangre Grande in northeast Trinidad, near Santa Estella Estate, one of the largest cocoa estates in the Caribbean. He was the sixth child of nine children. The family moved to Siparia when Ramsawack was 11, and later moved to Princes Town. He attended Presentation College in San Fernando before attending teachers' training college in Port of Spain. He later returned to south Trinidad, settling in La Romaine and Marabella before finally settling in Rousillac.

Career
Ramasawack began teaching at San Fernando Government Secondary School in 1962. In 1971 he started writing and illustrating articles about local folklore for the Trinidad and Tobago Guardian. Ramsawack wrote over 300 children's stories, and created Monkey Polo, an original character which starred in many of his stories.

See also
 M. P. Alladin
 Peter Kempadoo

References

Trinidad and Tobago writers
1930 births
2021 deaths
Folklorists
People from Sangre Grande region
People from Siparia region
Recipients of the Hummingbird Medal